Album recorded by female Japanese pop artist Watanabe Misato. It was released on August 6, 2003 by Sony Music Entertainment.

Track listings

Orange -What's the vibe?-
Maboroshi no Tsubasa (=Phantom Wings)
Koyubi (=Little Finger)
Zigzag
Mayonaka Sugi no Tsuki (=Moon after the midnight)
Gloria
Funky kitchen -Slow food no susume-(=-Recommendation of Slow Food-)
Tenshi ga iru no wo Shitte iru kai (=Do you know that Angel exists?)
ONE MORE KISS
7 colours

External links
Sony Music Entertainment - Official site for Watanabe Misato. 
Album Page - Direct link to page with song listing and music samples.

2003 albums
Misato Watanabe albums